The 1996–97 European football season was the 93rd season of Sport Lisboa e Benfica's existence and the club's 63rd consecutive season in the top flight of Portuguese football. The season ran from 1 July 1996 to 30 June 1997; Benfica competed domestically in the Primeira Divisão and the Taça de Portugal. The club also participated in the UEFA Cup Winners Cup as a result of winning the previous Taça de Portugal.

To manage the team in the new season, Benfica appointed Paulo Autuori. The Brazilian had just won the Brasileirão with Botafogo and was working in the background with the club since January 1996. He signed Jamir and Donizete from Botafogo, plus others like Jorge Bermúdez or Ronaldo Guiaro. Major departures included Ricardo Gomes, Paulo Bento and Daniel Kenedy.

The season started with different outcomes in the different competitions. While in the Primeira Divisão, Benfica reached the first place by September; in the Supertaça Cândido de Oliveira, the panorama was the opposite, with Benfica conceding a five-nil home loss with FC Porto. Until January, Autuori led the team through the first and second round of the Cup Winner's Cup, and battled with Sporting over the second place.

In January, the league campaign took a turn for the worse, Benfica lost twice in a row and Autuori was sacked. Mário Wilson was interim in one game (another loss); before the permanent appointment of Manuel José. With José, Benfica performance in the Primeira Divisão became much more irregular. Consecutive wins  and consecutive losses were followed by intercalating  wins and draws. In May and June Benfica, lost four times in five match-days, and hit new record lows, both in number of losses and points to league winner. In the domestic cup, José led them to their second final in a row, but lost it to Boavista.

Season summary
In the wake of a Cup-winning campaign, Benfica opened the new season by appointing a new manager, Paulo Autuori, who had been working with the club for past six months. The Brazilian manager had just finished the 1995 Campeonato Brasileiro Série A, where he led Botafogo to their second league title in history. From his former club, he brought in Jamir and Donizete, plus directly recommended the purchase of Bermúdez.

The season began with the first leg of the 1996 Supertaça Cândido de Oliveira against FC Porto, bringing a one-goal deficit back. A week later; on the opening game of the Primeira Liga, Benfica drops two points against S.C. Braga in a home draw. Still, with two convincing wins in early September, Benfica reached top of the table, together with four other teams. With the second leg of the Supercup next, Benfica received Porto on 18 September. However, the contend quickly became an unbalanced one, with Porto scoring five goals to none, as Preud'Homme prevented an even darker outcome The team was not disturbed by this defeat, and continued racking up consecutive league wins, even achieving a two-point lead over the second place; while the results in Europe were looking accordingly.

In late October, Benfica visited Sporting for the Derby de Lisboa, losing one-nil and dropping down one position. A week later, with a further two more points dropped, Porto opened a three-point gap at the front. By the time the Clássico arrived, the distance was already five points. Losing 1–2 to Porto, increased it to eight. Affected by the defeat, Benfica lost for a second time on a row, with the priority changing from battling Porto in the title race, to defending the second place from Sporting. Autuori was sacked immediately, and Mário Wilson was appointed interim for one game. The move did not have any effect on the team sharpness, as Benfica lost for a third in a row for the first time since 1957–58. The club lapped the first round of the league already one point behind their cross-town rivals Sporting, and fourteen from Porto. Manuel José was chosen was new manager on 26 January. The 50-year-old had managed Sporting and Boavista before with mild success, and was tasked with saving the season.

José's first game was a difficult visit to Braga; Benfica equalized one-nil and brought a point home, but lost two for Sporting. With the league race resolved, Benfica focused on the Portuguese Cup, progressing to the sixth round after defeating C.S. Marítimo. March was a particularly difficult month, as the team dropped eight points in just three match-days, being in danger of losing third place fourth place. In the UEFA Cup Winners' Cup, Benfica ended its European campaign, after not being able to revert a 2–0 home loss against Rui Costa's Fiorentina, despite a marginal win in Florence.

In April, the team gained some distance to the fourth place, S.C. Salgueiros, allowing them to focus on the Portuguese Cup. With the advantage of receiving smaller teams at home in the knock-out stages, Benfica progressed to the semi-finals after beating Dragões Sandinenses in the quarter-final, meeting Porto next. On the last day of April, the club defeated Porto by two-nil with goals from Valdir and Edgar Pacheco, reaching a second consecutive Portuguese Cup final, where they enter as title-holders. On the league campaign, Benfica track record on the final six league match-days, was four losses, a win and a draw, losing fifteen more points, ending the season a record-breaking twenty-seven points from Porto, fourteen from Sporting. On 10 June, in the 1997 Taça de Portugal Final, Benfica was surprised by Boavista, with a two-nil at the half-hour, they could not recover, giving Boavista their fifth national cup.

Competitions

Overall record

Supertaça

Primeira Divisão

League table

Results by round

Matches

Taça de Portugal

UEFA Cup Winners' Cup

First round

Second round

Quarter-finals

Friendlies

Player statistics
The squad for the season consisted of the players listed in the tables below, as well as staff member Paulo Autuori (manager), Mário Wilson (manager) and Manuel José (manager).

|}

Transfers

In

In by loan

Out

Out by loan

References

Bibliography
 

S.L. Benfica seasons
Benfica